Knight-mare Hare is a 1955 Warner Bros. Merrie Melodies theatrical cartoon directed by Chuck Jones and written by Tedd Pierce. The short was released on October 1, 1955, and stars Bugs Bunny.

Plot 
Loosely based on Mark Twain's 1889 novel A Connecticut Yankee in King Arthur's Court, the cartoon begins with Bugs Bunny, who is reading a book on the Knights of the Round Table under a hairdryer. While reading, an apple falls and hits his head and he is somehow transported to the time of King Arthur. When he wakes up, he finds himself at the pointy end of a knight's lance. Bugs asks him: "What's up, Duke?" and the knight commands Bugs to surrender as a prisoner of his lance. The knight identifies himself as "Sir O of Kay, Earl of Watercress, Sir Osis of The Liver, Knight of the Garter, and Baron of Worcestersistercestersoustercestersistershire." Ready to take Bugs' challenge to tilt with him for the insult of Bugs' friends, the Duke of Ellington, Count of Basie,  Earl of Hines, Cab of Calloway and Satchmo of Armstrong who the knight never heard of and called them "upstarts and rogues", the knight offers Bugs a too heavy sword, then begins to charge at him, during several comedic attempts by Bugs to get the sword off the ground. At the last second, Bugs puts his leg out tripping the knight's horse. The horse falls and the knight pole vaults on his lance over the castle wall and into a high window of a castle tower, falling loudly to the bottom inside the tower.

Bugs is later chased by a fire-breathing dinosaur-type dragon. ("My, what big horny toads they have here.") He manages to defeat him by spraying seltzer into his mouth. With his fire lost, the powerless dragon whimpers and flees.

Bugs later goes to another castle, the residence of a wizard named Merlin of Monroe. Merlin changes Bugs into a pig with some "magic powder", but as Merlin laughs, Bugs simply unzips the "costume" into his normal self. He later uses the "magic powder"on the wizard into becoming a horse. Merlin tries hard to change himself back to normal by also "unzipping", but only ends up with the same horse appearance, then continues to keep unzipping into the same costume no matter how many times he unzips the costume.  To try to return to the present, Bugs Bunny throws an apple in the air to hit him on the head ("Well, why not? After all, they've laughed at the man when he discovered penicillin"); he is successful in this attempt.  Walking down the country road, he approaches a farmer tending to a plowhorse wearing a beane cap who looks exactly like the one he turned Merlin into.  He walks on by, convincing himself that it is not the same animal, proclaiming "Nah, impossible. Couldn't be him". The farmer then says "Alright, Merlin, giddy up, get along now", to which Bugs does a surprised double-take to the camera, ending the cartoon.

Home media
The cartoon is available on the Looney Tunes Golden Collection: Volume 4 DVD box set.

See also
 Bugs Bunny: Lost in Time

References

External links

 Knight-mare Hare at the Big Cartoon DataBase

1955 films
1955 animated films
1955 short films
1950s fantasy comedy films
Merrie Melodies short films
Warner Bros. Cartoons animated short films
Short films directed by Chuck Jones
American fantasy comedy films
Arthurian animated films
Films based on A Connecticut Yankee in King Arthur's Court
Films scored by Milt Franklyn
Bugs Bunny films
1955 comedy films
1950s Warner Bros. animated short films
1950s English-language films